Wu Dixi (born 1962 in Nanhai, Guangdong) is a retired Chinese female badminton player.

Career
Wu was part of a cadre of Chinese players who dominated women's international badminton after China became a member of the International Badminton Federation in 1981. She won the 1982 and 1984 All-England Championships and the 1983 IBF World Championships in women's doubles with Lin Ying. Wu played on the world champion Chinese Uber Cup (women's international) teams of 1984 and 1986. She was perhaps world class badminton's most effective practitioner of the "spin seve," in which the shuttle is struck on the side of the feathers rather than on the cork—producing a highly erratic flight, until it was banned by the International Badminton Federation (now Badminton World Federation) after her first All England victory. Though primarily a doubles player, Wu won singles at both the German and Swedish Opens in 1982.

External links
All England champions 1899-2007

Badminton players from Guangdong
Living people
Asian Games medalists in badminton
People from Nanhai District
Chinese female badminton players
Badminton players at the 1982 Asian Games
Asian Games gold medalists for China
Asian Games bronze medalists for China
Medalists at the 1982 Asian Games
1962 births
21st-century Chinese women